Deoxyglucose may refer to:

 1,5-Anhydroglucitol (1-deoxyglucose)
 2-Deoxy-D-glucose (2-deoxyglucose)